Villa Hidalgo, Chiapas may refer to:
 Villa Hidalgo (Villaflores), Chiapas, Mexico
 Villa Hidalgo (Tuzantán), Chiapas, Mexico

See also
 Villa Hidalgo (disambiguation)